Pacific Beach State Park is a public recreation area in Grays Harbor County, Washington. The  state park offers  of Pacific Ocean beachfront and activities that include picnicking, camping, fishing, swimming, clam digging, and beachcombing.

References

External links 
Pacific Beach State Park Washington State Parks and Recreation Commission 
Pacific Beach State Park Map Washington State Parks and Recreation Commission

Parks in Grays Harbor County, Washington
State parks of Washington (state)